José Martí International Airport , sometimes known by its former name Rancho Boyeros Airport, is an international airport located  southwest of the centre of Havana, Cuba, and is a hub for Cubana de Aviación and Aerogaviota, and former Latin American hub for the Soviet (later Russian) airline Aeroflot. It is Cuba's main international airport, and serves several million passengers each year. The facility is operated by Empresa Cubana de Aeropuertos y Servicios Aeronáuticos (ECASA).

The airport lies in the municipality of Boyeros and connects Havana with the rest of the Caribbean, North, Central and South America, as well as Europe. It is named in memory of patriot and poet José Martí.

In the 1960–1990s, the airport was used by bombardiers to send revolutionaries to Central America.

Private Cuban citizens are not allowed to own aircraft; all aircraft in Cuba belong to state-owned airlines or the military. Only government- and foreign-owned aircraft are allowed to use the facilities. As of 2020, Copa Airlines was the foreign airline with most flights to the airport, operating 34 flights a week (roughly five daily flights) from Panama City, Panama, and Bogotá, Colombia.

History

The current José Martí Airport in 1930 replaced the Columbia Airfield, which was the first airport to serve Havana. The original name of the airport, Rancho Boyeros, meaning the "(Bull) Drover Ranch", was in reference to the name of the plains where the airport was being built. It was known as the Rancho Boyeros because in colonial times a local family had built a thatched hut and provided meals and an inn to the weary drovers that brought agricultural products to the capital from Batabanó and Vuelta Abajo.

To give a progressive environment to the airport, the old ranch homes were transformed into a small town that would serve as an industrial, livestock, agriculture and commercial centre, rising comfortable homes, an industrial technical school, a paint factory and other facilities. The town today is known as the Boyeros Municipality.

Beginnings

 1929: The construction of José Martí Airport, formerly Rancho Boyeros Airport, was authorized in March 1929 by General Order No. 223.
 1930: On February 24, the airport opened, replacing Havana Columbia Airfield.
 1930: On October 30, the first flight by Cubana de Aviación (formerly Compañía Nacional Cubana de Aviación Curtiss) from Havana to Santiago de Cuba carried the mail on a Ford Trimotor with stops in Santa Clara, Morón and Camagüey.
 1936: non-commercial flights to Madrid started with a Lockheed Sirius named September 4, commanded by Capt. Antonio Menéndez Pélaez. She was flown via Venezuela, Natal, Brazil, and Dakar, Senegal.
 1943: By January 1943 the airport had its first control tower, the first in the country.
 1945: The International Air Transport Association (IATA) is formed at Havana.
 1945: Cubana's first international flight out of the airport was a Douglas DC-3 to Miami on May 15.
 1946: First transatlantic flight from any Latin American country to Europe: Havana-Madrid was on DC-4, operated by Aerovias Cubanas Internacionales (Cunnair), founded by Cuban pioneer Reinaldo Ramirez Rosell. 
 1948: On May 5 Cubana's first transatlantic flight Havana-Madrid was on DC-4 Estrella de Cuba.
 1950: On April 2 the airport had a second route to Europe, Havana-Rome on a Cubana de Aviación DC-4.
 1951: The first night flight landed at the airport from Santiago de Cuba with a DC-3.
 1953: First flight to Mexico City on a Cubana Constellation.

International service in the 1950s
 Pan American World Airways in the 1950s had 4-8 daily flights from Havana to Miami. It connected Havana with Mérida and San Salvador, with DC-4 and DC-6. It also had flights to the south, including Jamaica, Venezuela and other South American countries. 
 Aerolíneas Argentinas connected Buenos Aires to Havana via Rio de Janeiro, Trinidad, and New York City, with DC-6s.
 Aeropostal Venezolana S.A. flew Miami-Havana-Caracas with Super Constellations.
 Braniff International Airways DC-6s connected Havana to the north with Houston, and to the south with Panama and other South American countries, such as Ecuador, Peru, Colombia, Argentina and others.
 Delta Air Lines connected Havana with New Orleans and Chicago and to the south with Montego Bay, Jamaica and Caracas. It also flew from Havana to Port-au-Prince, Haiti, Santo Domingo, Dominican Republic, and San Juan, Puerto Rico. It flew with Convair 440 and DC-7. Delta resumed its flights to New Orleans in March 2015, after not flying the route for over 50 years.
 Iberia vied with Cubana in the route to Madrid, with Super Constellations.
 KLM flew between Havana-Montreal-Europe with DC-7 and the route Miami-Havana-Curaçao, with DC-6 and DC-7.
 LACSA, Líneas Aéreas Costarricenses, connected Havana with San José and other cities in Central America, such as Guatemala City, mainly with Convair 340.
 Mackey Airlines inaugurated its passenger service between Fort Lauderdale and Havana, with DC-4.
 Mexicana de Aviación flew between Havana, Mérida and Mexico City, 4 times weekly.
 National Airlines in 1958 flew daily from New York City, Tampa, and Miami, with DC-6, DC-7 and Convair 340/440.
 Cubana de Aviación in 1958 flew five daily Viscount 818s to Miami, and Bristol Britannia 318s to Madrid, Mexico City, and New York.

Recent history
In 1961, diplomatic relations with the United States deteriorated substantially and with the United States embargo against Cuba, airlines from the United States were not permitted to operate regular scheduled flights to the airport. That year, two days prior to the failed Bay of Pigs Invasion organized by the CIA with the participation of Cuban exiles, Douglas A-26 Invader aircraft from Brigade 2506 bombarded José Martí Airport and Antonio Maceo Airport in Santiago de Cuba.

Because of Cuba's relationship with the Soviet Union, the airport during the 1970s and 1980s enjoyed the presence of many Eastern Bloc airline companies, such as Aeroflot, Czechoslovak Airlines, Interflug, and LOT Polish Airlines. In 1977 an Aeroflot Ilyushin Il-62 operating a scheduled flight from Moscow to Havana via Frankfurt and Lisbon crashed after takeoff from Lisbon, killing 68 of the 70 on board and one person on the ground. In 1989 another Ilyushin Il-62, operated by Cubana as Cubana de Aviación Flight 9046, crashed shortly after takeoff from Havana. All 115 passengers and 11 crew members as well as a number persons on the ground were killed.

In 1988, Terminal 2 was constructed in anticipation of future charter flights to the United States. In the 1990s the special charter flights were approved by the US government, to operate from Miami for Cuban citizens living in the United States that have close relatives in Cuba. Today, various airlines operate non-stop scheduled charter service between Havana and Miami. Terminal 2 was remodeled and expanded in 2010.

On 31 December 1997 a Concorde landed in Cuba for the first time, landing at José Martí Airport. The London-Paris-Barbados-Havana Air France flight was received at the airport by Fidel Castro, who boarded the aircraft and greeted the crew and passengers. On 26 April the following year, the new International Terminal 3 was inaugurated by Canada's Prime Minister Jean Chrétien and Cuba's President Fidel Castro. In 2002 Air Freight Logistics Enterprise (ELCA S.A.) opened José Martí's first freight terminal known as the Aerovaradero Freight Terminal. The terminal has a  capacity,  of space in two refrigeration and freezing chambers, with humidity and gas controls.

In 2007, three young recruits who deserted from the Cuban Army tried to hijack a commercial passenger aircraft aiming to defect to the United States. At Terminal 1, the would-be hijackers killed one of the hostages, a lieutenant colonel.

Special charter service to the United States were allowed from the 1990s, but were required to be operated by travel companies licensed by the U.S. government, largely from Florida.  In March 2015, Sun Country Airlines started operating regularly scheduled charter flights from New York during the Cuban Thaw. Regularly scheduled commercial service to and from the United States began again in the fall of 2016, with such airlines as American, Delta, JetBlue and, after January 2017, Alaska, flying to Havana. However, several airlines had dropped, if not cut back, flights to Cuba by late 2017 due in part to President Trump's decision to reimpose stricter travel regulations, therefore partially ending the Cuban Thaw. Several other reasons that the airlines ended the flights were because of weaker-than-expected demand and a paucity of tourist infrastructure.

In February 2016, a VIP room at the airport was used as the location for the historic meeting of Pope Francis and Patriarch Kirill.

In March 2020, Cuba announced that it was closing its borders because of the COVID-19 pandemic. Only humanitarian flights were then permitted. On 10 November 2020, it was announced that the airport would re-open to commercial flights on 15 November. Some airlines started operations again, but not all those which had flown previously. In January 2021, the Cuban authorities placed restrictions on the number of flights from a number of countries, and halted flights from a few. Separately, Canadian airlines stopped flying to Caribbean destinations, including Cuba.

Terminals

There are currently three passenger terminals in general use at the airport. Terminal 1 is used primarily for domestic flights. Terminal 2 opened in 1988, primarily for charter flights to the United States. Ten years later on 27 April 1998, the International Terminal 3 opened, offering many modern facilities and jetways that the former international Terminal 1 did not provide. For transfer between terminals, bus services are offered.

Terminal 1
Domestic Terminal 1 was the main international and domestic terminal building in the airport prior to the opening of Terminals 2 and 3. It is located on the east side of Runway 6, and is now used primarily for domestic flights.

Terminal 2
Terminal 2 handles some long-distance international flights, such as to Zürich, Frankfurt, and Helsinki, along with a few Caribbean flights, such as to Aruba, Trinidad and Tobago, and most scheduled charter flights to and from Miami, Tampa, Ft. Lauderdale, and New York City. The scheduled charter flights to the United States are operated by Gulfstream Air Charters, ABC Charters, Marazul Charters, CTS Charters, and C & T Charters. It was constructed in 1988 when the first charter flights after the revolution were opened from Miami. There are bars, bookshops, newsagents, a restaurant, and car rentals.

Terminal 3
International Terminal 3 is the main international terminal, opened in 1998. It is the largest and most modern of all terminals. Ticketing and departures are located on the upper level; arrivals and baggage carousels are located on the lower level. There are several car rentals located in the arrivals area.

Airlines and destinations
The following airlines operate regular scheduled and charter flights at Havana Airport:

  Turkish Airlines' flight from Havana to Istanbul makes a stop in Caracas. However, the airline does not have traffic rights to transport passengers solely between Havana and Caracas.

Accidents and incidents
 A 1977 Aeroflot Ilyushin 62 crash on May 27 killed 68 of the 70 on-board and one person on the ground. At the time, the accident was the deadliest aviation accident in Cuba's history; it remains the third deadliest. One of the victims was José Carlos Schwarz, a poet and musician from Guinea-Bissau.
 On July 7, 1983, Air Florida Flight 8 with 47 people on board was flying from Fort Lauderdale International Airport to Tampa International Airport. One of the passengers handed a note to one of the flight attendants, saying that he had a bomb and telling them to fly the plane to Havana, Cuba. He revealed a small athletic bag, which he opened and inside was an apparent explosive device. The airplane was diverted to Havana-José Martí International Airport and the hijacker was taken into custody by Cuban authorities.
 On September 3, 1989, Cubana de Aviación Flight 9046, an Ilyushin Il-62M (CU-T1281) operating a non-scheduled international passenger flight to Cologne (Cologne Bonn Airport), West Germany, crashed shortly after take-off. All 115 passengers and 11 crew members as well as 24 persons on the ground were killed and the aircraft was written off.
 On May 3, 2007, two army recruits hijacked a plane destined for Miami at José Martí International Airport in Havana. The men killed a hostage before being arrested prior to takeoff. It was the first Cuban hijacking attempt reported since the spring of 2003.
On May 18, 2018, a Global Air (Mexico) Boeing 737-200 operating as Cubana de Aviación Flight 972 crashed after takeoff, killing 112 of the 113 people on board (107 passengers and 6 crew).

See also
 List of airports in the Caribbean
 List of the busiest airports in the Caribbean

References

External links

 Technical Specifications of this airport at IAS (Integrity Aviation System) with Airport diagram
 Cuban Airports at Cuban Aviation by Ruben Urribarres

Airports in Cuba
Transport in Havana
Buildings and structures in Havana
Airports established in 1930
1930 establishments in Cuba
20th-century architecture in Cuba